Wayne Arthurs and Paul Hanley were the defending champions, but lost in the first round this year.

Jonas Björkman and Todd Woodbridge won in the final 6–3, 6–4, against Wayne Black and Kevin Ullyett.

Seeds

Draw

Draw

External links
Draw

Doubles
2004 ATP Tour